Phoonk 2 is a 2010 Indian horror film written and directed by Milind Gadagkar. It is a sequel to Ram Gopal Varma's 2008 film Phoonk and stars Sudeep, Amruta Khanvilkar and Ahsaas Channa. The film was released on 16 April 2010 with about 900 prints worldwide including the digital format. The film was dubbed in Tamil as Bommayi 2 and in Telugu as Aavaham.

Plot

On winning a new construction project, Rajiv moves with his family to a new place, one which is both close to the woods, as well as the beach. Rajiv's mother has gone to Rishikesh, so he stays there only with his wife Aarti, two kids, and housemaid Laxmi. Rajiv's kids, Raksha and Rohan begin exploring the new place and the surroundings – the lonely beach and then the woods behind the house. They are soon visited by Rajiv's sister Arushi and her husband Ranjit aka Ronnie, who had come to spend some time with the family.

The terror begins with Raksha and Rohan finding a doll in the woods and bringing it home. It happens to be a doll controlled by the ghost of Madhu, who has now returned from the dead to take revenge on Rajiv. It then progresses to a series of highly traumatizing experiences for the whole family. Madhu enters Aarti and she begins to act weirdly. Rajiv soon realizes that Madhu has returned from the grave and wants revenge. He immediately informs his friend Vinay, who helped him previously in killing Madhu, and his friend sets out to find Anshuman, Madhu's husband, hoping that the latter can be of some help. But unfortunately, on his way, he is attacked in his car by Madhu and he meets with an accident.

Manja, the exorcist who kills Madhu, meets a gruesome death at the hands of her ghost. Advised by Vinay, Rajiv now approaches another exorcist, but he is not of much help. He advises Rajiv to leave the city and go someplace where Madhu cannot reach him. Eventually, this man is also killed by Madhu's possessed doll, but not before he manages to burn it.

Now the grotesque killings begin. The watchman and Laxmi are murdered brutally, Arushi is drowned in the swimming pool of the house, and Aarti, possessed by Madhu's spirit, acts weird. Rajiv is left alone with his two children at home, and Aarti (Madhu) begins to traumatize them from all directions. Rohan and Ronnie are trapped in their room, with no way to help. The ghost attacks Rajiv and Raksha and stabs Rajiv. It then moves to kill Raksha, with a wounded and helpless Rajiv trying his best to protect her in the heavy rain. Finally, they reach the terrace, where Rajiv attacks Aarti and pushes her off the rooftop, and she falls to her death. The ghost now leaves Aarti and the family for the time being.

The film ends with Rajiv carrying Aarti into the house, with Raksha, Rohan, and Ronnie couldn't believe their grief. The film ends with Rajiv and Ronnie crying at their respective wife's death.

Cast
Sudeep as Rajiv (voice dubbed by Rajesh Khattar)
Amruta Khanvilkar as Aarti
Amit Sadh as Ronnie
Ahsaas Channa as Raksha
Rishabh Jain as Rohan
Anu Ansari as Lakshmi
Ashwini Kalsekar as Madhu
Neeru Bajwa as Arushi
Ganesh Yadav as Vinay
Zakir Hussain as Manja
Vikas Shrivastav as Balu
Rakesh Raj as Property Agent
Chyan Trivedi as Goswami
Jeeva as Exorcist
Dhiraj Regmi as Exorcist #2

Release

Contest
Director Rama Gopala Varma claims that Phoonk 2 is scarier than Phoonk and says that the person who can watch the film without getting scared can win Rs 500,000. According to Varma, "Someone who says he won’t be scared while watching the film will be shown Phoonk 2 in a theatre alone. He will be attached to an ECG machine to monitor his heart beat and the machine will be connected to a screen outside the hall. If his heart beat stays normal, he will win Rs. 500,000."

The person who dared to watch Phoonk 2 alone was Hitesh Sharma from Mumbai. The contest was held at FAME Cinemas. The contestant lost the contest. After the contest Varma told reporters that "The bottom line is the challenger has lost and we won. I am very happy". There were screens outside the hall to monitor his heartbeats and facial expression. After watching the film for 45 minutes, Hitesh took away his face from the screen and waved saying he couldn't take the scares anymore. "There were many scenes, which were really scary but I was controlling myself. Then came a scene which I couldn't bear any more, so I gave up."

Varma offered Hitesh to work with him in Phoonk 3. "I am very happy to be a part for Ramu’s Phoonk 3. I have just learned that he has offered me a role. Nothing was planned. I got scared and I feel Ramu is right when he says "My film is scarier", Hitesh added.

Reception

Critical reception
lvis D Silva of Rediff quoted as "too much noise" and gave 2.5/5. Sonia Chopra of sify.com gave 2.5/5 and said "Phoonk 2 starts off being scarier and bloodier than the first film, but ends up conforming to the regular horror fare complete with spirit possessions and the white-eyed ghost.". Nikhat Kazmi of THE TIMES OF INDIA said "Phoonk 2 is just another run-of-the-mill horror film and doesn't do anything to lift the genre to another level altogether" and gave 2.5/5. Anupam Chopra of NDTV gave 2/5 and said that "There are a few fun moments here – the tantrik who messed with Madhu in the first film loses his head, literally. But mostly Phoonk 2 is all tease and no pay-off". Rajeev Masand of CNN IBN gave 2/5 and said "Phoonk 2 is not scary enough". Taran Adarsh gave 1.5/5.

Box office
The film collected 6,86,00,000 in 3 weeks. The boxofficeindia.com has termed that film as a 'theatrically flop' despite the collection being surpassed the budget of 4 crores that is because the film was released with a huge number of prints and the occupancy in the theatre was only 50%. The site also mentioned that the film also made business through satellite rights, thus recovering the costs of the producers. It was aired on ZEE Cinema in 2016.

External links

References

2010 films
2010s Hindi-language films
2010s supernatural horror films
2010s ghost films
Indian ghost films
Indian supernatural horror films
Indian sequel films